James Andrew Sexton (January 5, 1844 – February 5, 1899) was an American soldier, businessman, and Republican politician from Chicago who served as Commander-in-Chief of the Grand Army of the Republic until his death.

Biography
Sexton was born in Chicago in 1844 and enlisted in the Union Army at the outbreak of the American Civil War, rising to captain and serving on the general staff of General William S. Smith. He participated in the Battles of Columbia, Spring Hill, and Franklin. Following his service, Sexton returned to Chicago where he founded Cribbon, Sexton and Company, a stove manufacturing firm. Politically a Republican, Sexton served as an elector in the 1884 United States presidential election and was appointed postmaster of Chicago by newly elected President Benjamin Harrison in 1889, remaining in office until 1893. He was also Sexton was active in veteran's affairs and served as a colonel in the Illinois National Guard. He was chosen Commander-in-Chief of the Grand Army of the Republic in 1898, a position he filled until his death at the age of 55.

References

1844 births
1899 deaths
Grand Army of the Republic Commanders-in-Chief
People of Illinois in the American Civil War
1884 United States presidential electors
Military personnel from Illinois
Illinois Republicans
Postmasters of Chicago